Tell Murtafa is an archaeological site 900m northwest of Tell Bire village in the Beqaa Mohafazat (Governorate). It dates at least to the Early Bronze Age.

References

Baalbek District
Bronze Age sites in Lebanon